Steven Terence Thorne (born 15 September 1968) is an English retired professional footballer who played as a midfielder in the Football League for Brentford. Despite making just two appearances, his surname served as the inspiration for the name of the long-running Brentford fanzine Thorne In The Side.

Career statistics

References

1968 births
English footballers
English Football League players
Association football midfielders
Brentford F.C. players
Living people
Footballers from Hampstead
Watford F.C. players
Maidenhead United F.C. players
Isthmian League players